Clavus herberti is a species of sea snail, a marine gastropod mollusk in the family Drilliidae.

Description
The length of the brownish orange shell attains 16.4 mm, its diameter 6.1 mm. The strongly patterned, claviform shell has a rather low spire and a proportionally large and blunt protoconch. It shows fine and numerous spiral threads.

Distribution
This marine species occurs off East London - S KwaZulu-Natal, South Africa.

References

Endemic fauna of South Africa
herberti
Gastropods described in 1988